is a Japanese football player. He played for Blaublitz Akita.

Career
Masaya Yuma joined J3 League club Blaublitz Akita in 2016.

Club statistics
Updated to 22 March 2018.

Honours
 Blaublitz Akita
 J3 League (1): 2017

References

External links

Profile at Blaublitz Akita

1993 births
Living people
Toyo University alumni
Association football people from Saitama Prefecture
Japanese footballers
J3 League players
Blaublitz Akita players
Association football forwards